Kalvar or Kaluvar may refer to:

Kalvar, Ardabil
Kaluvar, Kohgiluyeh and Boyer-Ahmad

See also
Kolvar (disambiguation)